Swayam Krushi is a 2011 Indian Kannada-language romantic drama film directed by debutante, Veerendra Babu, who also produced, wrote the screenplay, and acted in the film alongside newcomer Tamanna Pasha. The film did not perform well at the box office.

Cast 
 Veerendra Babu as Vijaykumar
 Tamanna Pasha as Kalyani
 Bianca Desai as Priya
 Ambareesh as a chief minister
 Suman as GK, a contractor
 Charan Raj as Prakash Bhandari, Kalyani's father
Rekha V. Kumar as Kalyani's mother
 Vijay Chendoor
 Janardhan as Amogh
 Satyajith
 Chidanand 
 Umashree
 Rangayana Raghu
 Mumaith Khan in an item number

Soundtrack

Reception 
A critic from The Times of India gave the film a rating of three out of five stars and wrote that "Though N Veerendrababu has selected a drab subject, a number of sequences keep you glued to the movie". In a review by Deccan Herald, the reviewer stated that "Director Veerendra Babu has shown people it is alright to apply the words of Mahatma Gandhi, Swami Vivekananda and others, to achieve success and create a modern Ram Rajya". A critic from Bangalore Mirror wrote that "Swayam Krushi's only credit is that it does not descend into the lowest ebb". A critic from Indo-Asian News Service wrote that "Babu's direction clearly shows his inexperience in filmmaking, but the real dampner is his performance as protagonist".

References

External links 

2011 romantic drama films
2011 films
Indian romantic drama films